Partido Comunista de Portugal may refer to:

 Communist Party of Portugal (Marxist-Leninist)
 Communist Party of Portugal (Marxist-Leninist) (1974)